Rally or rallye may refer to:

Gatherings 
 Demonstration (political), a political rally, a political demonstration of support or protest, march, or parade  
 Pep rally, an event held at a United States school or college sporting event

Sports 
 Rallying, a category of motorsport  
 Rally (tennis), a sequence of shots in tennis  
 Rally obedience (also rally-O), a dog sport
 Rally scoring, a point scoring system common in racket and net sports
 Rally point system, the system of scoring points in volleyball
 Rally Cycling, a UCI ProTeam professional road cycling squad

Vehicles 
 SOCATA Rallye, a French-built light aircraft
 Rotec Rally, an American ultralight aircraft
 Automobiles Rally, a defunct French sports cars manufacturer

Other uses 
 Rally (How I Met Your Mother), a 2014 episode of the TV series How I Met Your Mother
 Rally's, another brand of the American fast-food restaurant chain Checkers
 Windows Rally, a network simplification technology produced by Microsoft
 Rally Software, a web-based project management tool, owned by Broadcom Corporation
 Rally (stock market), a sudden, significant rise in the price of an individual security or in the market as a whole
 Rally.org, a social online fundraising platform
 The Rally (New Caledonia), a conservative political party
 RALLY, a fourth-generation programming language created by Digital Equipment Corporation for the OpenVMS platform.
 Terminal lucidity, also known has the rally or rallying

See also
 Raleigh (disambiguation)
 Rayleigh (disambiguation)